Voto is an extinct Chibchan language of Costa Rica, which was spoken by the Boto people.

References

Chibchan languages
Extinct languages of North America
Languages of Costa Rica